Tajik State Pedagogical University is a university in Tajikistan. It is located in Dushanbe at 121 Rudaki Street.

References

Universities in Tajikistan
Education in Dushanbe
Educational institutions established in 1931
1931 establishments in the Soviet Union